Davahchi-ye Olya (also Romanized as Davahchī-ye ‘Olyā and Davechī-ye Bālā) is a village in Arshaq-e Shomali Rural District of Arshaq District, Meshgin Shahr County, Ardabil province, Iran. At the 2006 census, its population was 754 in 168 households. The following census in 2011 counted 810 people in 216 households. The latest census in 2016 showed a population of 752 people in 240 households; it was the largest village in its rural district.

References 

Meshgin Shahr County

Towns and villages in Meshgin Shahr County

Populated places in Ardabil Province

Populated places in Meshgin Shahr County